Joy Kingston (December 6, 1922 – January 30, 2010) was a fashion designer. She was born in Kansas City, Missouri. Kingston graduated from high school at the early age of 15, in June 1938. She subsequently studied at the University of Missouri for one year, and then attended The University of Wisconsin beginning in 1939, where she majored in Art in the university's School of Home Economics. In her studies there, an emphasis existed on dress design and interior decoration, which influenced her aspirations for these occupations. Kingston also studied for one additional semester at the Kansas City Art Institute.

References

  
   Abstract: "Leave it to a California designer to ignore the traditional fall colors and develop her own--all to good purpose, too. That's exactly what Joy Kingston did in her collection of spectator sportswear titled, "Woman About Town and Country."

1922 births
2010 deaths
Artists from Kansas City, Missouri
American fashion designers
American women fashion designers
University of Missouri alumni
University of Wisconsin–Madison alumni
Kansas City Art Institute alumni
21st-century American women